Clare–South Galway was a parliamentary constituency represented in Dáil Éireann, the lower house of the Irish parliament or Oireachtas from 1969 to 1977. The constituency elected 3 deputies (Teachtaí Dála, commonly known as TDs) to the Dáil on the system of proportional representation by means of the single transferable vote (PR-STV).

History
The constituency was created under the Electoral (Amendment) Act 1969 and was first used at the 1969 general election to the 19th Dáil. It was used again at the 1973 general election to the 20th Dáil.

Clare–South Galway was abolished under the Electoral (Amendment) Act 1974, the next revision of constituencies, with effect from the 1977 general election. The areas in County Clare were incorporated into the existing Clare constituency, while the Galway territories were divided between the two new constituencies of Galway East and Galway West. The new constituency of Galway West included a different part of County Clare.

Boundaries
The Clare part of the constituency had been included since 1923 in the Clare constituency. However, it was only a small area of County Clare (a sparsely-populated part of the mountainous area in the north-east of the county centered around Tulla). Clare–South Galway also included a small part of County Roscommon.

It was defined in the 1969 Act as:

TDs

Elections

1973 general election

1969 general election

See also 
Dáil constituencies
Politics of the Republic of Ireland
Historic Dáil constituencies
Elections in the Republic of Ireland

References

External links
 Oireachtas Members Database

Historic constituencies in County Clare
Historic constituencies in County Galway
Dáil constituencies in the Republic of Ireland (historic)
1969 establishments in Ireland
1977 disestablishments in Ireland
Constituencies established in 1969
Constituencies disestablished in 1977